WWCC may refer to:

Government
Wagga Wagga City Council a local government area in the Riverina region of south-western New South Wales, Australia.

Education
Walla Walla Community College (WWCC) is a multi-campus community college located in southeastern Washington.
Western Wyoming Community College (WWCC) is a two-year college located in Rock Springs, Wyoming.

Media
WWCC-LP (97.3 FM) is a radio station licensed to the Triangle Foundation, based in Lafayette, Indiana.

Sport
Women's World Chess Championship (WWCC), an international chess competition.
World Women's Curling Championship, a yearly international curling competition.

Other
Working With Children Check, an Australian background check for employees and volunteers in child-related work.